The Heroin Busters is a 1977 Italian crime film directed by Enzo G. Castellari and starring Fabio Testi, David Hemmings and Sherry Buchanan.

Production
The Heroin Busters was director Enzo G. Castellari's last crime film of the 1970s. The film was shot in Rome, Genoa, Cartagena, Amsterdam and New York.

The score of the film was provided by the Italian progressive rock group Goblin who had just written their score for Dario Argento's film Suspiria. The score is composed of funk, psychedelia, and rock music.

Cast

Release
The Heroin Busters was released in Italy on August 13, 1977. It was distributed by Titanus and grossed 1,308,550,110 Italian lira. Roberto Curti, author of Italian Crime Filmography, 1968-1980 described the box office gross as performing "moderately well", but not as well as expected.

It was released on DVD by Blue Underground on April 25, 2006.

Reception
Among modern reviews, AllMovie gave the film three stars out of five, referring to it as "a stylish and fast-paced entry into the Italian crime genre that hits all the right marks for genre fans." as well as noting "The one real defect of La Via Della Droga is that it lacks a human story element to get the viewer emotionally involved but Castellari makes up for that oversight by keeping the story taut and fast-paced." Roberto Curti, author of Italian Crime Filmography, 1968-1980, compared the film Casterllari's The Big Racket, stating that unlike that film "the result is a cold, technically impeccable yet overindulgent formalist exercise in style" that contained a  "comic book-style script, populated by dull characters"

See also
 List of Italian films of 1977
 List of crime films of the 1970s

Notes

References

External links

1977 films
1970s Italian-language films
1977 crime films
Poliziotteschi films
Films scored by Goblin (band)
Films directed by Enzo G. Castellari
Films shot in Rome
Films shot in New York (state)
Films shot in Amsterdam
Films shot in Hong Kong
1970s Italian films